Line SFM2 is part of the Turin Metropolitan Railway Service. It links Turin (at Dora GTT station) via Turin Caselle airport, Venaria Reale and nearby Allianz Stadium.

Future Development

A railway tunnel is planned to be built under Corso Grosseto, a major east-west artery in the city, to link the current Turin-Ceres line with Porta Susa station. The duration of the construction is estimated to be three years, but will happen in stages to minimise impact on local residents and business owners. Two overpasses on Corso Grosseto will be demolished, and replaced by a signalled intersection. In order to reduce traffic, a  underpass will also be built under Largo Grosseto.

On  the demolition of the Corso Grosseto overpasses was halted due to the discovery of asbestos within the structure. This could delay the demolition work by two months.

References

Turin Metropolitan Railway Service
Railway lines opened in 2012